Étang de Lachamp is a lake in the commune of Manzat, Puy-de-Dôme, France. At an elevation of 820 m, its surface area is 0.13 km².

Lachamp